The ORR-West Line (provisionally Orange Line) is a proposed line that will become part of Namma Metro's network in the city of Bangalore, Karnataka, India. Phase-3A of Namma Metro consists of two lines that are planned to be opened sometime in 2028-29. Both lines will have a common depot at Sumanahalli where the new lines will intersect.

Stations

ORR-West Line (Orange Line)
The ORR-West Line is planned to have 22 stations.

Hosahalli-Kadabagere Line
This line is planned to have 9 stations. The line's livery (or name) is yet to be announced.

See also
 Namma Metro
 Purple Line
 Green Line
 Yellow Line
 Pink Line
 Blue Line
 List of Namma Metro Stations
 Rapid transit in India
 List of metro systems

References

Namma Metro lines
Proposed railway lines in India